Entro, also known as Entro Siding and P and E Junction, was a rail junction in Yavapai County, Arizona, United States.
It was the point at which the Prescott and Eastern Railroad met the Santa Fe, Prescott and Phoenix Railway, eventually part of the Atchison, Topeka and Santa Fe Railway. In 1917 it had a population of 15. The lines were eventually abandoned.

References

Populated places in Yavapai County, Arizona